Boll or Böll is a German, Danish & English surname.  Notable people with the surname include:
 Buzz Boll (1911–1990), Canadian ice hockey player
 Don Boll (1927–2001), American football player
 Ernst Boll (1817–1868), German naturalist and historian
 Fabian Boll (born 1979), German football player
 Franz Boll (philologist) (1867–1924), German historian of astrology
 Franz Boll (historian) (1805–1875), theologian and historian
 Franz Christian Boll (1849–1879), discoverer of rhodopsin
 Greg Boll (born 1960), American politician
 Heinrich Böll (1917–1985), German novelist (Nobel Prize Literature 1972)
 Jacob Boll (1828–1880), Swiss naturalist and entomologist
 Jared Boll (born 1986), American ice hockey player
 Monika Boll (born 1971), German footballer
 Paul Boll (born 1986), German ice dancer
 Robert Henry Boll (1875–1956), preacher in the Churches of Christ 
 Timo Boll (born 1981), German table tennis player
 Uwe Boll (born 1965), German movie director

See also
Bol (surname)
Bowles (surname)

German-language surnames